John Wayles Jefferson (born John Wayles Hemings; May 8, 1835June 12, 1892), was an American businessman and Union Army officer in the American Civil War.  He is believed to be a grandson of Thomas Jefferson; his paternal grandmother is Sarah (Sally) Hemings, Jefferson's mixed-race slave and half-sister to his late wife.

Early life and family

John's father, Eston Hemings, was born a slave at Monticello in 1808, the youngest of Sally Hemings' six mixed-race children. They are widely understood to have been the children of President Thomas Jefferson, Hemings' master. As they were seven-eighths European in ancestry, under Virginian law at the time they were legally white. But they were born into slavery under the slave law principle of partus sequitur ventrem, by which children of slave mothers took the status of the mother. Sally Hemings was three-quarters white and a half-sister of Jefferson's late wife, Martha Wayles Skelton.

Thomas Jefferson informally and formally freed all of Sally's four surviving children. He let the first two "escape" when they came of age; they went North to Washington, DC and passed into white society, both marrying white spouses. Jefferson's will freed Madison and Eston Hemings shortly after the president's death in 1826; Eston was "given his time" so that he did not have to wait until the age of 21 for freedom. Madison, already 21, had been freed immediately. In 1830 Eston purchased property in Charlottesville, on which he and his brother Madison built a house. Their mother Sally lived with them until her death in 1835.

In Charlottesville, Eston married Julia Ann Isaacs, a mixed-race daughter of a wealthy Jewish merchant, David Isaacs from Germany, and Nancy West, a free woman of color, who built an independent bakery business in the town.  John Wayles Hemings was the eldest child of Eston and Julia, born in Charlottesville in 1835.  His first and middle name were after his great-grandfather John Wayles.  As a widower Wayles had fathered six children by his enslaved concubine Betty Hemings, of whom the youngest was Sally Hemings.  Eston and Julia's second child, Anna Wayles Hemings (1837–1866), was also born in Charlottesville.

After his mother Sally died, Eston and Julia Ann Hemings moved their family to Chillicothe in the free state of Ohio, where they settled for more than 15 years. His and Julia's youngest child, Beverley Frederick Hemings (1839–1908), was born there.  The town had a thriving free black community and strong abolitionist activists, who together helped fugitive slaves along the Underground Railroad. Eston was well known as a musician and entertainer. The children were educated in the public schools. His brother Madison Hemings and his family also moved there.

In 1852, after passage of the Fugitive Slave Act increased the danger to members of the African-American community as slave catchers came to Ohio, as they sometimes kidnapped free blacks to sell them into slavery, the family moved north to Madison, Wisconsin, the state capital. There, the entire family took the surname "Jefferson" to reflect Eston's and the children's ancestry. John was 17, Anna 16, and Beverly 13 at the time of the move. The family lived as part of the white community in Madison and for the rest of their lives. As adults, both Anna and Beverly Jefferson married white spouses; John never married. Anna died young in 1866 at the age of 30.

Career
Before the Civil War, John W. Jefferson operated the American House hotel in Madison, Wisconsin, where he brought on his younger brother Beverly to help and learn the business.

Military service
At the age of 26, Jefferson entered the volunteer Union Army on August 26, 1861, at Madison, Wisconsin. He served in the 8th Wisconsin Infantry Regiment during the American Civil War. On September 28, 1861 he was promoted to major; to lieutenant colonel on April 23, 1863; and to colonel on June 16, 1864. He fought in significant battles of the war and was wounded at Vicksburg and during the Siege of Corinth. He was mustered out of service on October 11, 1864, at Madison, Wisconsin.  His brother, William Beverly Jefferson, also served as a white soldier in the Union Army.

According to service records, John Jefferson had red hair and gray eyes (as did Thomas Jefferson). Photographs show his strong resemblance to Thomas Jefferson.

In 1902, a former neighbor from Chillicothe recalled John Jefferson's concerns about his mixed ancestry in the social climate of the times:

... and I saw and talked with one of the sons, during the Civil War, who was then wearing the silver leaves of a lieutenant colonel, and in command of a fine regiment of white men from a north-western state. He begged me not to tell the fact that he had colored blood in his veins, which he said was not suspected by any of his command; and of course I did not.

Post-war career
Jefferson wrote as a newspaper correspondent during and after the war, publishing articles about his experiences. After the war, he moved to Memphis, Tennessee, where he became a highly successful cotton broker, founding the Continental Cotton Company.

He raised cotton in Arkansas and bred blooded trotting horses on his plantation near Memphis. Articles under his name in the Memphis Daily Avalanche cover such matters as improving streets, enlarging the city's boundaries, and preventing cotton-warehouse fires.

Jefferson never married.  He died on June 12, 1892.  He was interred in Madison, Wisconsin, in the Jefferson family plot at Forest Hill Cemetery. He left a sizeable estate.

Ancestry controversy

Historians disputed as to whether Thomas Jefferson had children with his slave Sally Hemings. Fawn McKay Brodie and Annette Gordon-Reed presented new analyses that assessed the historiography, showing evidence that other historians had overlooked.

Y-DNA tests conducted in 1998 confirmed that a male-line descendant of John's brother Beverly had a male ancestor in common with male-line descendants of the Jefferson line. (As Thomas Jefferson had no acknowledged male descendants, another from his line had to be tested, but Y-DNA was passed unchanged.) This supported the Hemings family's tradition of descent from Thomas Jefferson. As the Carr DNA did not match, the Jefferson family tradition (stated by two grandchildren) that his Carr nephew(s) had fathered Sally Hemings' children was disproved. For most historians, this data, together with the weight of historical evidence, confirmed the Hemings family's claim of descent from Thomas Jefferson.

References

External links
 Jefferson Family Papers, UCLA Library, Department of Special Collections
 "Thomas Jefferson's Madison Descendants?", Wisconsin Historical Society
 Thomas Jefferson, PBS Frontline
 

Jefferson family
1835 births
1892 deaths
People of Wisconsin in the American Civil War
Businesspeople from Madison, Wisconsin
Businesspeople from Charlottesville, Virginia
Journalists from Wisconsin
American people of English descent
American people of German-Jewish descent
Hemings family
Union Army colonels
People from Chillicothe, Ohio